Denzel Prempeh née Denzel Agyeman-Prempeh is a Ghanaian-born gospel musician and pastor. Denzel's career started in 2010 with the establishment of 'HeartbeatMusic'. He has since released two live albums, 'Tent Experience' in 2014, and 'A Sound from Heaven' in 2015 with four singles, 'Sweet Holy Spirit' in 2017, 'Obiaa Enihor','Meni Obiaa' and 'Ayeyi' all in 2018 under the record label 'HeartbeatMusic'. He also wrote an extended play, 'Jesus medley'. He is a reverend pastor at Destiny Chapel, Mount Zion in Adenta, Accra.

Early life and education 
Denzel hails from Ejisu, Ashanti Region and is the third of nine children born to Agyeman-Prempeh Senior. He first joined the St. Andrews Junior High School Choir where he received his basic education and later moved to Presbyterian Boys Senior High School where he became the music director of the school choir. He joined the Chosen Vessel Choir whiles in University of Ghana and later joined the University of Ghana Mass Choir where he became the music director. In 2006, he joined the Love Project Choir under the leadership of Danny Nettey who he deemed a father and mentor.

Personal life 
Agyeman-Premeph is married to Maame Agyeman-Prempeh with whom he has two children. He pastors at Destiny Chapel, Mount Zion in Adenta, Accra.

Career 
In 2010, Denzel founded 'HeartbeatMusic' (HBM) as a non-denominational Christian music group and has since expanded to reach the United Kingdom, United States of America and (Germany) starting originally in Ghana. Under the record label 'HeartbeatMusic', he has released songs including his hits, 'Come Dwell in Me', 'Healing Song', 'Sweet Holy Spirit' and 'Ayeyi'. In collaboration with 'HeartbeatMusic', he has released two live albums, 'Tent Experience' in 2014, 'A Sound from Heaven' in 2015, an extended play, 'Jesus medley' and four singles,'Sweet Holy Spirit' in 2017,'Obiaa Enihor','Meni Obiaa' and 'Ayeyi' all in 2018 for his professional career. His flagship program,'Touching God's Heart' (TGH) has received a lot of publicity over the years leading to its recognition as the Best Event Management System by Shine Awards in 2017.

HeartbeatMusic Worldwide has grown into sub-ministries and organized other concerts like Just As We Are, Revelations of the Alabaster Box, and The Cross Choir. In 2017, the Heartbeat Foundation was set up to support families of individuals with cerebral palsy.

Live Recording Concerts
 (2011) The Worship Concert 
 (2012) A Heart of Worship 
 (2013) Tent Experience
 (2014) A Sound From Heaven
 (2015) Wordship
 (2015) JUWA (Just As We Are)
 (2015) ROTAB (Revelations of the Alabaster Box)
 (2016) Dipped in Grace
 (2017) A Deeper Touch
 (2017) Victory (TGH-UK)
 (2017) Testify (TGH-USA)
 (2018) The Potter And Clay Experience
(2019) The Wilderness Experience

Discography

Major singles 
 Sweet Holy Spirit
 Obiaa Enihor feat KODA
 Meni Obiaa (I Have No One)
 Ayeyi (Praise)

References

External links 
 

1984 births
Living people
21st-century Ghanaian male singers
Ghanaian gospel singers
Musicians from Accra
University of Ghana alumni